The Blue Sapphire Stakes is a Melbourne Racing Club Group 3 Thoroughbred horse race held over 1200 metres at set weights for three-year-old horses at Caulfield Racecourse, Melbourne, Australia. Total prize money for the race is A$200,000.

History
The current rendition of The Blue Sapphire Stakes was inaugurated in 2012 with prizemoney of A$$250,000. Originally, from 2005 the MRC scheduled a two-year-old race in May known as the Blue Sapphire Classic. However, the MRC decided to re-format their Melbourne Spring Racing Carnival in 2012 by adding a new three-year-old race for sprinters. Entries which were nominated for the Blue Diamond Stakes earlier in the year as two-year-olds were automatically nominated for this event.

In 2012 the race was held on Caulfield Guineas day but since 2014 the race was moved to the second day of the carnival, the Wednesday meeting.

Grade
 2014–15 - Listed Race
 2016 - Group 3

Distance
 2005 onwards  – 1200 metres

Name
For two-year-olds:
 2005–07 - Blue Sapphire Classic
 2008–11 - Blue Sapphire Stakes
 2012 - Redoute's Choice Stakes
 2013 - Catanach's Jewellers Stakes

For three-year-olds:
 2012 onwards - Catanach's Jewellers Blue Sapphire Stakes

Winners

Three year old  
Event held during the MRC Spring Racing Carnival.

 2022 - Grand Impact
 2021 - Extreme Warrior
 2020 - Ranting
 2019 - Anaheed
 2018 - Written By
 2017 - Formality
 2016 - Flying Artie
 2015 - Keen Array
 2014 - Eloping
 2013 - Lion Of Belfort
 2012 - Snitzerland

Two year old (2005– ) 
From 2012 the race retained the Listed grading but was reregistered as the Redoute's Choice Stakes and is held in late April or early May.

 2011 - City Of Song
 2010 - Smokin' Joey
 2009 - Black Caviar
 2008 - Gold in Dubai
 2007 - Emjay Hussay
 2006 - Green Birdie
 †2005 - Readyforcatherine

† Run at Sandown Racecourse Hillside track

See also
 List of Australian Group races
 Group races

References

Horse races in Australia
Flat horse races for three-year-olds
Caulfield Racecourse